Seal Island is a small land mass located  off the northern beaches of False Bay, near Cape Town in South Africa. The island is so named because of the great number of Cape fur seals that occupy it. It is also home to seabirds, and it is likely that non-marine species  fly there to breed as well . The island is long and narrow – . There is no vegetation, soil of any significance, or beach.

A radar mast was built on the island during World War II by a crew who lived in prefabricated huts for the duration of the construction but this tower gradually succumbed to corrosion and was blown over in a winter storm in 1970. All that remains of it is rusty, twisted metal. There are the ruins of a few huts and other structures from the sealing and guano-collection era (first half of the 20th century). Some rock inscriptions made by sealers in the 1930s are still evident.

Fauna 
Besides the Cape fur seal, there is the Brown fur seal, and the dense population of seals at certain times of the year attracts the seal's main predator, the great white shark. Seal Island and the adjacent waters provide rare opportunities for those who wish to witness attacks by great whites on the Cape fur seal and to observe social interactions amongst creatures of both species. The island has become famous for the size of the sharks, and for their favoured way of catching their prey – a shark launching an attack will come up from underneath and hurl itself out of the water with the seal in its mouth. It has been shown that if the seals enter the "Ring of Death" (where the sharks circle the island) on the surface instead of at the murky bottom, they are more likely to be picked off by the faster and more aggressive great white.

Since 2001, Seal Island, False Bay has been popularized by the Discovery Channel series Air Jaws, which feature the breaching behavior of Great Whites near the island. A 2019 sequel, "Air Jaws Strikes Back" names a "second Seal Island", this time located in Mossel Bay on the southeast coast of South Africa.

References

External links 
 Surface Pursuit of a Cape Fur Seal by a White Shark at Seal Island.
 "White Shark Predatory Behavior at Seal Island"
 University of Cape Town Avian Demography Unit
 Photographing Africa's "Flying Sharks" from National Geographic's web site

Uninhabited islands of South Africa
Geography of Cape Town
Atlantic islands of South Africa